is a Japanese politician of the Liberal Democratic Party, a member of the House of Councillors in the Diet (national legislature). A native of Fukushima Prefecture, he graduated from National Defense Academy of Japan with a major in applied physics and joined the Japan Ground Self-Defense Force (JGSDF). In the JGSDF, he was the commander of the Japanese Iraq Reconstruction and Support Group. After his retirement as colonel in 2007, he was elected to the House of Councillors for the first time in 2007.

References

External links 
  in Japanese.

1960 births
Living people
Anti-Korean sentiment in Japan
Japan Ground Self-Defense Force personnel
Japanese people of the Iraq War
Liberal Democratic Party (Japan) politicians
Members of the House of Councillors (Japan)
National Defense Academy of Japan alumni